Stařeč is a market town in Třebíč District in the Vysočina Region of the Czech Republic. It has about 1,700 inhabitants.

Administrative parts
The village of Kracovice is an administrative part of Stařeč.

Notable people
Bernard Grun (1901–1972), German composer and conductor

References

Populated places in Třebíč District
Market towns in the Czech Republic